Willi Schäfer (born 29 August 1932) is a German bobsledder. He competed in the four-man event at the 1968 Winter Olympics.

References

External links
 

1932 births
Living people
German male bobsledders
Olympic bobsledders of West Germany
Bobsledders at the 1968 Winter Olympics
People from Starnberg (district)
Sportspeople from Upper Bavaria
20th-century German people